Charl Cilliers is a settlement in Gert Sibande District Municipality in the Mpumalanga province of South Africa. The village is some 32 km north of Standerton.

History
Originally known as Van Tondershoek, it was renamed  in 1917 after the Voortrekker Sarel Cilliers.

References

Populated places in the Govan Mbeki Local Municipality